The Phalanx; or Journal of Social Science was a Fourierist journal published in New York City, edited by Albert Brisbane and Osborne Macdaniel from 1843 to 1845.

The Phalanx was eventually moved, along with another publication called The Social Reformer to Brook Farm in West Roxbury, Massachusetts. They became one journal called The Harbinger; its first issue was published on June 14, 1845. Its first issue under this title announced its mission:

After Brook Farm's dissolution, the publication was eventually moved to New York City under the editorial control of George Ripley and Charles Anderson Dana where it continued weekly until October 1847. In addition to Ripley and Dana, early contributors to The Harbinger included Parke Godwin, James Russell Lowell, William Wetmore Story, John Greenleaf Whittier, and Nathaniel Parker Willis. Edgar Allan Poe, who strongly distrusted the Utopian movements, referred to The Harbinger as "the most reputable organ of the Crazyites".

References

History of political thought journals
Fourierism
History of socialism
History of the United States journals